Tim Boys (b.  in Oamaru, New Zealand) is a New Zealand rugby union player that plays provincial rugby for Southland, and is in the Super Rugby team the Crusaders (rugby union).

Career
Boys first played for Otago in 2005 then transferred to Southland after an injury break, where he has been a regular starter as openside flanker.

References

External links
Highlanders Profile

1984 births
Living people
New Zealand rugby union players
Highlanders (rugby union) players
Otago rugby union players
Southland rugby union players
Rugby union players from Oamaru
Rugby union flankers
Crusaders (rugby union) players